The Tunisia Billie Jean King Cup team represents Tunisia in the Billie Jean King Cup tennis competition and are governed by the Fédération Tunisienne de Tennis.

History 
Tunisia competed in its first Fed Cup in 1992. Their best result was third place in its Group II pool on four occasions.

See also 
 Fed Cup
 Tunisia Davis Cup team

External links 
 

Billie Jean King Cup teams
Fed Cup
Fed Cup